Agastache parvifolia is a species of flowering plant in the mint family known by the common name small-leaf giant hyssop. It is endemic to far northern California, where it grows in woodlands. It is an uncommon species and is sometimes considered a local subspecies of Agastache urticifolia.

Description
This plant is an aromatic perennial herb producing an erect stem with triangular serrated leaves on petioles. This species is characterized by leaves under 5 centimeters long and 3.5 wide. The inflorescence is a spike occupying the top of the stem. The flowers have pink-tipped green sepals and tubular pink corollas.

References

External links
Jepson Manual Treatment
USDA Plants Profile
Photo gallery

parvifolia
Endemic flora of California